The group “Elips” was formed in 1986. The first concert was held in March, 1986. The first members were:

Soon Vardan Mamikonyan left the group and Aram Petrosyan (Batya) became the drummer of the group. In a short period of time the group gained popularity in Armenia and gave numerous concerts. Already in summer 1986 “Elips” went on tours to Latvia, where they played together with a Riga group “Pilligrim”. Simultaneously with the fame, the group gained the hatred of the Soviet party nomenclature and already in the end of the year 1986, it was prohibited and was announced as an anti-Soviet group. In spite of this fact the group went on giving underground concerts becoming more and more popular. Attitude of the soviet authorities led to the use of impudent (for that period of time) songs “Gorbachyov.....”, “politbureau....”, in lyrics of which the soviet authorities were criticized openly.

In 1987 simultaneously with changes many rock-festivals, rock-concerts were organized, the first rock-records appeared. “Elips” participated practically in all the festivals in Armenia, gave concerts in different Armenian regions. The stadiums were full of fans.

The creative activity of the group lasted till 1992, when its members went to war as volunteers to defend and liberate their homeland. During 1992-1994 “Elips” sometimes in the periods of war actions managed to give concerts and take part in few for that time festivals.

After the war the group went on with concerts, creative activities up to 1999, afterwards it was interrupted up to the year 2009. For that 20 and more years the group members were:

The repertoire of the group consists of more than 60 songs written and performed in the period of the years 1986-1999. The group plays in the style of hard rock.
The group took part in the following festivals:

The group gave concerts practically in all the regions of Armenia, went on tours to the republics of Baltic, Chechen – Ingushetia.
At present the group works on the album “Elips 20 years later”.
Soon the presentation of DVD version of this album will be held.

External links

 Elips on MySpace
 YouTube

Armenian rock music groups
Armenian rock musicians
Soviet rock music groups